Ellert is a given name and surname of Germanic origin. Like the related Eilers, Ehlers and Eilert it has emerged from the medieval Germanic first name Eilhart/Eilhard (agi(l) = "awe", "terror" + hart = "hard", "strong"). 
Notable people with the surname include:

Given name 
 Ellert Schram (born 1939), Icelandic former footballer and politician
 Ellert Sölvason (1917–2002), Icelandic footballer

Surname 
 Gundi Ellert  (born 1951), German television actress
 Levi Richard Ellert (1857–1901), 23rd mayor of San Francisco

References

Icelandic masculine given names
German-language surnames
Surnames from given names